The 2006 Illinois elections were held on November 7, 2006. On that date, registered voters in the State of Illinois  elected officeholders for U.S. Congress, to six statewide offices (Governor/Lieutenant Governor, Attorney General, Secretary of States, Treasurer and Comptroller), as well as to the Illinois Senate and Illinois House.

The incumbent Treasurer Judy Baar Topinka, previously the only Republican elected statewide, made an unsuccessful run for Governor rather than stand for re-election. Democrat Alexi Giannoulias was elected to succeed her, and the Democratic incumbents for the other statewide offices won re-election, making Illinois the only Midwestern state in which Democrats held all statewide offices.

For the first time since the 1930s, all executive offices and control of the Illinois General Assembly was won by the Democratic Party. The last time any party had met this feat had been the mid-1990s, when the Republican Party held such power following the 1994 Illinois elections.

Election information
2006 was a midterm election year in the United States.

Turnout

Primary election
For the primary election, turnout was 24.84%, with 1,804,624 votes cast.

Turnout by county

General election
For the general election, turnout was 48.64%, with 3,587,676 votes cast.

Turnout by county

Federal elections

United States House 

All 19 of Illinois’ seats in the United States House of Representatives were up for election in 2006.

No seats switched parties, leaving the composition of Illinois' House delegation 10 Democrats and 9 Republicans.

State elections

Governor and Lieutenant Governor

The 2006 Illinois gubernatorial election took place on November 7, 2006. Incumbent Democratic Governor and Lieutenant Governor Rod Blagojevich and Pat Quinn won re-election to a second four-year term.

Attorney General 

Incumbent Democratic Attorney General Lisa Madigan won reelection to a second term in office

Democratic primary

Republican primary

General election

Secretary of State 

Incumbent Democratic Secretary of State Jesse White won reelection to a third term in office.

Democratic primary

Republican primary

General election
Green Party nominee Adrian Frost withdrew before the election.

Comptroller 

Incumbent Comptroller Daniel Hynes, a Democrat, was reelected to a third term.

Democratic primary

Republican primary

General election

Treasurer 

Incumbent Treasurer Judy Baar Topinka, a Republican, did not seek reelection to a second term, instead opting to run for governor. Democrat Alexi Giannoulias was elected to succeed her.

Democratic primary

Republican primary

General election

State Senate

39 of the seats of the Illinois Senate were up for election in 2006.

State House of Representatives

All of the seats in the Illinois House of Representatives were up for election in 2010.

Judicial elections
Multiple judicial positions were up for election in 2010.

Local elections
Local elections were held. These included county elections, such as the Cook County elections.

Notes

References

External links
 Candidate Filing (Illinois State Board of Elections)
 Campaign Disclosure (Illinois State Board of Elections)

 
Illinois